Loughborough Amherst School, formerly known as Our Lady's Convent School (OLCS), is an independent day school for girls and boys aged 4 to 18. It is situated in Loughborough, UK.
It is founded on traditional Christian principles and embraces all faiths.

Until August/September 2015, it was run by the Rosminians order.    In September 2015, it became subsumed into the Loughborough Endowed Schools, a body which changed its registered name with effect from 19 April 2018 to "Loughborough Schools Foundation".   The Rosminian Sisters continue to occupy part of the site.  The school buildings are leased by the Rosminians to the Loughborough Schools Foundation.

Some of the buildings are grade II listed.

A wide variety of GCSE and A Level subjects are offered in the Senior department. RS GCSE is compulsory, and is taken a year early; this is successful in focusing the students for their following exam year and achieves high results. In addition there are a variety of cultural, musical and sporting activities. The school has participated in the Duke of Edinburgh's Award scheme for many years. It also takes part in the Young Enterprise scheme.

In April 2018, the school announced a new policy of accepting boys into the secondary school from September 2019. This was announced alongside a new name – Loughborough Amherst School – which came into effect in September 2018.

Origins and history 

In 1841, Lady Mary Arundell (c. 1785-1845) (widow of Lord Arundell of Wardour) opened a small school for girls in her home Paget House in Woodgate, Loughborough.

Lady Mary asked the Rosminian Sisters of Providence to assist her in this endeavour and two nuns from Italy were sent to Loughborough.   On the Solemnity of the Annunciation ("Lady Day") 25 March 1844, the Rosminian sisters took charge of the work, which thus became the first Roman Catholic school in England run by religious sisters.

Mary Amherst (Sister Mary Agnes) (1824-1860) joined the Order in 1846 and came to Loughborough.  In 1854, she became the first Superior in England of the Order.  Loughborough became the central house of the Rosminian Sisters in England.

Mary was a young lady engaged to the renowned architect Augustus Pugin.  Pugin had proposed to Mary in November 1844, shortly after the death of his second wife.   Mary had accepted.  However, the engagement did not last, for in May 1846 Mary entered the Order of the Rosminian Sisters of Providence.  Mary's brother William became a Jesuit.   Her brother Francis became Roman Catholic Bishop of Nottingham (1858 to 1879).

A convent was established at Gray Street, Loughborough and the school moved to Gray Street.  The convent and chapel were designed by architect Charles Hansom, brother of the inventor of the Hansom cab.   Charles was an acolyte of Augustus Pugin.

Alumnae 

Alumnae include:

 Lydia Rose Bewley (born 1985), actress
 Molly Smitten-Downes (born 1987), singer
 Sophie Hahn (born 1997), para athlete and former World Champion

References

External links 
 https://lsf.org/amherst/

Roman Catholic private schools in the Diocese of Nottingham
Grade II listed buildings in Leicestershire
Private schools in Leicestershire
Girls' schools in Leicestershire
Grade II listed educational buildings
Educational institutions established in 1850
1850 establishments in England
Member schools of the Independent Schools Association (UK)
Loughborough